Time Lock is a 1957 British thriller film directed by Gerald Thomas. The plot is about a six-year-old boy who is accidentally locked in a bank vault. With less than 10 hours of oxygen left in the vault, it becomes a race to save the boy. The film features a young, pre-James Bond Sean Connery. The boy is played by Vincent Winter and his parents are played by Lee Patterson and Betty McDowall.

Although set in Canada the film was shot in England.

Cast
 Robert Beatty as Pete Dawson
 Lee Patterson as Colin Walker
 Betty McDowall as Lucille Walker
 Vincent Winter as the Boy (Steven/Stephen Walker)
 Robert Ayres as Inspector Andrews
 Alan Gifford as George Foster
 Larry Cross as Reporter
 Sandra Francis as Evelyn Webb
 Gordon Tanner as Dr. Hewitson
 Jack Cunningham as Max Jarvis
 Victor Wood as Howard Zeeder
 Peter Mannering as Dr. Foy
 Roland Brand as Police officer
 Sean Connery as Welder

References

External links 
 
 

1957 films
1950s thriller films
Films set in Canada
1950s English-language films
British black-and-white films
Films directed by Gerald Thomas
Films with screenplays by Peter Rogers
Films produced by Peter Rogers
Films based on works by Arthur Hailey